The Douglas of Glenbervie, Kincardine Baronetcy was created on 28 May 1625 in the Baronetage of Nova Scotia. (First creation)

The Douglas of Kelhead, Scotland Baronetcy was created 26 February 1668 in the Baronetage of Nova Scotia.

The Douglas of Carr, Perthshire Baronetcy was created on 23 January 1777 in the Baronetage of Great Britain for Captain (later Admiral) Charles Douglas as a result of his service in Quebec during the American Revolutionary War.
Upon Sir Charles' death in 1789, his eldest son, Vice-Admiral Sir William Henry Douglas, inherited the title. Sir William was unmarried, and upon his death in 1809, the baronetcy passed to his youngest brother, General Sir Howard Douglas, their middle brother having died as well.
The baronetcy is now extinct.

The Douglas of Maxwell, Roxburgh Baronetcy was created 17 June 1786 in the Baronetage of Great Britain .

The Douglas of Castle Douglas, Kirkudbright Baronetcy was created 17 July 1801 in the Baronetage of the United Kingdom.

The Douglas of Glenbervie, Kincardine Baronetcy (second creation) was created on 30 September 1831 in the Baronetage of the United Kingdom.

Douglas of Glenbervie (1625)

Sir William Douglas, 1st Baronet (died c. 1660) grandson of William Douglas, 9th Earl of Angus
Sir William Douglas, 2nd Baronet (died )
General Sir Robert Douglas, 3rd Baronet (died 24 July 1692), Colonel of the Royal Regiment of Foot, killed at the Battle of Steinkirk.
Sir Robert Douglas, 4th Baronet (c 1662 – 27 January 1748)
Sir William Douglas, 5th Baronet (c 1690 – 23 July 1764)
Sir Robert Douglas, 6th Baronet (1694 – 24 April 1770)
Sir Alexander Douglas, 7th Baronet FRCPE (1738 – 28 November 1812)
On his death the baronetcy became dormant

Douglas of Kelhead (1668)
Sir James Douglas, 1st Baronet (19 February 1639 – c. 1707)
Sir William Douglas, 2nd Baronet of Kelhead, (c. 1675 – 10 October 1733) was the son of the 1st Baronet and Catherine Douglas, a sister of the 3rd Earl of Queensbury (later the Duke of Queensbury).Sir William was married to Helen Erskine, a daughter of Colonel John Erskine, Deputy Governor of Stirling Castle. They had nine children, of whom their eldest son, Sir John Douglas, 3rd Bt. of Kelhead (b. 1733 – 13 November 1778) succeeded to the title upon his father's death.
Sir John Douglas, 3rd Baronet (c 1708 – 13 November 1778) MP for Dumfries-shire 1741–1747
Sir William Douglas, 4th Baronet (c 1731 – 16 May 1783), MP for Dumfries 1768–1780
Sir Charles Douglas, 5th Baronet. He subsequently succeeded to the Marquessate of Queensberry in 1810 with which title the baronetcy remains merged.

Douglas of Carr (1777)

 Admiral Sir Charles Douglas, 1st Baronet (1727–1789)
 Admiral Sir William Henry Douglas, 2nd Baronet of Carr, (28 July 1761  – 24 May 1809) was a British naval officer, the oldest son of Admiral Sir Charles Douglas. His mother was a Dutch woman named Uranie Lydie Marteilhe. He was one of six admirals to carry the canopy at Nelson's funeral. Sir William was unmarried and the baronetcy passed to his younger brother.
 General Sir Howard Douglas, 3rd Baronet (1776–1861), Governor of New Brunswick, Canada, High Commissioner of the Ionian Islands, MP for Liverpool 1842–1847
 Sir Robert Percy Douglas, 4th Baronet (1805–1891), Governor of Jersey
 Sir Arthur Percy Douglas, 5th Baronet (1845–1913), Under-Secretary for Defence, New Zealand
 Sir James Stewart Douglas, 6th Baronet (1859–1940)
Extinct on his death

Douglas of Maxwell (1786)
Sir James Douglas, 1st Baronet (1703 – 2 November 1787) MP for Orkney & Shetland 1754–1768
Sir George Douglas, 2nd Baronet (1 March 1754 – 4 June 1821) MP for Roxburghshire 1784–1806
Sir John James Scott-Douglas, 3rd Baronet (18 July 1792 – 24 January 1836)
Sir George Henry Scott-Douglas, 4th Baronet (19 June 1825 – 26 June 1885) MP for Roxburghshire 1874–1880
Sir George Brisbane Douglas, 5th Baronet (22 December 1856 – 22 June 1935)
Sir James Louis Fitzroy Scott Douglas, 6th Baronet (24 October 1930 – 16 July 1969)
Extinct on his death

Douglas of Castle Douglas (1801)
Sir William Douglas, 1st Baronet (died 1809)
Extinct on his death

Douglas of Glenbervie (1831)
Sir Kenneth Mackenzie Douglas, 1st Baronet (died 22 November 1833)
Sir Robert Andrews Douglas, 2nd Baronet (1807 – 1 November 1843)
Sir Robert Andrews Mackenzie Douglas, 3rd Baronet (19 July 1837 – 28 February 1884), MP for Marsden (1876–1879)
Sir Kenneth Douglas, 4th Baronet (29 May 1868 – 28 October 1954)
Sir Sholto Courtenay Mackenzie Douglas, 5th Baronet (27 June 1890 – 9 June 1986)

Extinct on his death.

References

Notes

Sources
Douglas, Percy. History of the Family Douglas, vol. I.
Cokayne,The Complete Baronetage V vols. Exeter 1902. 
Burke's Peerage and Baronetage (1938)

Baronetcies in the Baronetage of Nova Scotia
Dormant baronetcies in the Baronetage of Nova Scotia
Extinct baronetcies in the Baronetage of Great Britain
Extinct baronetcies in the Baronetage of the United Kingdom
1625 establishments in Nova Scotia
1777 establishments in Great Britain
1801 establishments in the United Kingdom